The 1988 Junior League World Series took place from August 15–20 in Taylor, Michigan, United States. Mexicali, Mexico defeated Hilo, Hawaii in the championship game.

This year saw the debut of the Canada Region.

Teams

Results

References

Junior League World Series
Junior League World Series
Junior